Kedar Jayprakash Naik (born 1979) is an Indian politician and businessperson from Goa. He is the current serving member of Goa Legislative Assembly representing the Saligao Assembly constituency. He won the seat after contesting from Indian National Congress ticket in 2022 Goa Legislative Assembly election. Naik defeated former Bharatiya Janata Party MLA Jayesh Salgaonkar by a margin of 1899 votes.

Early life and education 
Kedar Jayprakash Naik was born to Jayprakash Suryakant Naik. He completed his graduation in Bachelor of Commerce at Madurai Kamaraj University in 2006. He is married to a physiotherapist.

Political career 
Naik was a sarpanch of Reis Magos panchayat before winning the Saligao Assembly constituency in 2022.

References

1970s births
Living people
Goa MLAs 2022–2027
Bharatiya Janata Party politicians from Goa
Former members of Indian National Congress from Goa
Businesspeople from Goa